Primavera de Rondônia (Rondônia Spring) is a municipality located in the Brazilian state of Rondônia. Its population was 2,776 (2020) and its area is 606 km2.

References

Municipalities in Rondônia